Busquets is a Catalan surname. Notable people with the surname include:

Carles Busquets, Spanish footballer (Barcelona), father of Sergio Busquets
Florencia Busquets, Argentine volleyball player
Guillem Busquets, Spanish architect (:es:Guillem Busquets)
Jaume Busquets, Spanish sculptor and painter
Joan Busquets Grau, Spanish architect and urban planner
Joan Busquets i Jané, Spanish interior decorator (:es:Joan Busquets i Jané)
Joan Busquets Queralt, Spanish trade unionist and political activist (:es:Joan Busquets Queralt)
Joaquín Busquets, Mexican actor, father of Narciso Busquets (:es:Joaquín Busquets)
Julio Busquets, Spanish soldier and legislator (:es:Julio Busquets)
Miguel Busquets, Chilean footballer
Narciso Busquets, Mexican actor, son of Joaquín Busquets
Ricardo Busquets, Puerto Rican Olympic swimmer
Sergio Busquets, Spanish professional football player, son of Carles Busquets
Oriol Busquets, Spanish football player

Catalan-language surnames